The Internationalen Turbine Hallencup is an indoor five-a-side women's football invitational tournament organized by German club 1.FFC Turbine Potsdam. The inaugural edition was held in Potsdam's MBS Arena on 2 – 3 February 2013, and it was won by Brøndby IF.

List of finals

References

External links
Official site

Women's football friendly trophies
Sport in Potsdam
1. FFC Turbine Potsdam
Recurring sporting events established in 2013